The 2012 Mascom Top 8 Cup, also known as Mascom Top 8 Cup Season 1, was the inaugural season of the Mascom Top 8 Cup. It was played from May to 29 July 2012. It featured the top eight teams from the 2010-11 Botswana Premier League season. 

Township Rollers were crowned the inaugural champions after defeating ECCO City Greens 3-1 in the final.

History
The 2011-12 season was the first edition of the Mascom Top 8 Cup and was contested by the top eight teams from the previous premier league season. It was the second domestic cup in Botswana, being contested along with the 2011-12 Botswana FA Cup. The cup was predominantly southern, with only two northern teams taking part.

Prize money
 Champions: P1 000 000
 Runners up: P400 000
 Semifinalists: P200 000
 Quarterfinalists: P125 000

Format
A draw was conducted to decide the opponents. Quarterfinals were then played both home and away to determine the semifinalists. At the end of the quarterfinals the remaining teams were again drawn for a two-leg semifinal. The final was played only once. Three points were awarded for a win, one for a draw and none for a loss. Aggregate score was used to determine the winner and where it  was a tie then away goals were used and penalties if it was still a tie.

Quarterfinals

Semifinals

Final
| July 29 | Township Rollers | 3-1 | ECCO City Greens

Awards
 Top goalscorer |  Mogakolodi Ngele (6 goals) | Township Rollers
 Player of the tournament |  Ntesang Simanyana | Township Rollers
 Goalkeeper of the tournament |  Kabelo Dambe | Township Rollers
 Coach of the tournament |  Atshele Molapi | ECCO City Greens
 Referee of the tournament |  Kutlwano Leso
 Assistant referee of the tournament |  Moemedi Monakwane
 Best electronic journalist (radio) |  McDonald Rakgare  | Duma FM
 Best electronic journalist (TV) |  Benjamin Radimo | BTV
 Best radio commentator |  Fundi 
Gaoforwe | RB2
 Best print journalist |  Witness Taziba | Midweek Sun & Botswana Guardian
 Best TV commentator |  Mmoloki Mothibi | BTV
 Best photographer |  Oaitse Sejakgomo | Sunday Standard

References

Football competitions in Botswana